Iron(II) carbonate, or ferrous carbonate, is a chemical compound with formula , that occurs naturally as the mineral siderite.  At ordinary ambient temperatures, it is a green-brown ionic solid consisting of iron(II) cations  and carbonate anions .

Preparation
Ferrous carbonate can be prepared by reacting solution of the two ions, such as iron(II) chloride and sodium carbonate:

  +  →  + 2

Ferrous carbonate can be prepared also from solutions of an iron(II) salt, such as iron(II) perchlorate, with sodium bicarbonate, releasing carbon dioxide:

2 + 2 →  + 2 +  + 

Sel and others used this reaction (but with  instead of 2) at 0.2 M to prepare amorphous .

Ferrous carbonate also forms directly on steel or iron surfaces exposed to solutions of carbon dioxide, forming an "iron carbonate" scale:

  +  +  →  +

Properties

The dependency of the solubility in water with temperature was determined by Wei Sun and others to be

where T is the absolute temperature in kelvins, and I is the ionic strength of the liquid.

Uses
Ferrous carbonate has been used as an iron dietary supplement to treat anemia. It is noted to have very poor bioavailability in cats and dogs.

Toxicity

Ferrous carbonate is slightly toxic; the probable oral lethal dose is between 0.5 and 5 g/kg  (between 35 and 350 g for a 70 kg person).

References

Iron(II) compounds
Carbonates